The Charming Deceiver is a 1921 American silent drama film directed by George L. Sargent and starring Alice Calhoun, Charles Kent and Robert Gaillard.

Cast
 Alice Calhoun as 	Edith Denton Marsden
 Jack McLean as Frank Denton
 Charles Kent as 	John Adams Stanford
 Eugene Acker as 	Don Marsden
 Roland Bottomley as Richard Walling
 Robert Gaillard as Duncan

References

Bibliography
 Connelly, Robert B. The Silents: Silent Feature Films, 1910-36, Volume 40, Issue 2. December Press, 1998.
 Munden, Kenneth White. The American Film Institute Catalog of Motion Pictures Produced in the United States, Part 1. University of California Press, 1997.

External links
 

1921 films
1921 drama films
1920s English-language films
American silent feature films
Silent American drama films
American black-and-white films
Films directed by George L. Sargent
Vitagraph Studios films
1920s American films